Chie Katsuren (born 14 April 1989) is a Japanese handball player for Omron and the Japanese national team.

References

1989 births
Living people
Japanese female handball players
Handball players at the 2014 Asian Games
Handball players at the 2018 Asian Games
Asian Games silver medalists for Japan
Asian Games bronze medalists for Japan
Asian Games medalists in handball
Medalists at the 2014 Asian Games
Medalists at the 2018 Asian Games
People from Okinawa Prefecture
20th-century Japanese women
21st-century Japanese women